John C. Edmunds is an American economist, professor, and author, currently serving as Research Director of the Institute for Latin American Business Studies at Babson College. His work and opinions on the financial expansion leading to the 2008 financial crisis are controversial. He has served on the faculties of Boston University, Tufts University, Hult International Business School, and Harvard University.

Education 
Edmunds holds a D.B.A. in International Business from Harvard Business School, an M.B.A. in Finance and Quantitative Methods with honors from Boston University, an M.A. in Economics from Northeastern University, and an B.A. in Economics cum laude from Harvard College.

Career
Edmunds has taught at overseas MBA programs, including Instituto de Empresa in Madrid, Spain, INCAE in Central America and La Universidad Católica Madre y Maestra in the Dominican Republic, and two universities in Chile. He has also taught at other schools in the Boston area, including Boston University, the Fletcher School of Law and Diplomacy, Harvard University, Hult International Business School, and Northeastern University.  

He has consulted with the Harvard Institute for International Development, the Rockefeller Foundation, Stanford Research Institute, and numerous private companies.

Publications

Dr. Edmunds's areas of interest are international finance, capital markets, and emerging markets. He is the author of over 250 articles and cases published both in academic and practitioner journals. He has published four books. Over a hundred of his articles are about Latin American capital markets and have been published in Spanish, including "Rescate y Recuperacion," America Economia January, 2009; "Financiar a Emprendedores," Estrategia, January 20, 2006; "Cayendo al Segundo Lugar?" El Diario Financiero, July 7, 2005; "Iberoamerica necesita un Davos propio," Expansion, Madrid, Espana, June 20, 2005; "El Auge de la Bolsa en Chile como Impulsor del Crecimiento" (Parte I & II,) in El Diario Financiero, September 2004; and "El Valor Escondido de America Latina," in America Economia, July 2001. 
https://www.amazon.com/stores/author/B001HMTI1M/about

He is the author of five books to date including books: Desafiando La Pendiente, The Wealthy World, Wealth by Association, Brave New Wealthy World and "Rogue Money".  Rogue Money and the Underground Economy: An Encyclopedia of Alternative and Cryptocurrencies by John Edmunds (Editor) which describes the world of cybercurrency, which has experienced explosive growth in recent years, but that expansion has been accompanied by numerous controversies and misunderstandings about what it is, how it works, and how it relates to the underground economy and illegal activities such as money laundering, tax evasion, and human trafficking.

Many illegal or malicious activities are paid for with cyber currencies. This book covers those applications. But cyber currencies also have many legitimate, constructive applications, all of which are explained in Rogue Money in clear, plain English, without embellishment or exaggeration.

An authoritative and thought-provoking reference for readers seeking a greater understanding of all aspects of alternative cybercurrencies, this encyclopedia includes entries on economic history, international trade, current controversies, and its impact on the wider underground economy. It peels back the layers of jargon and obfuscation, giving each topic individual attention to show how it works and contributes to the whole.

Personal life 
Edmunds has lived in six countries and spent eighteen years abroad. As a professor and investor, Edmunds has always sought to shatter fatalism in working to ensure that people born into poverty can rise above their station particularly in regions where economic ascension is not easily attained.

References

External links
 POP! Goes the IPO for the BBC
 Medium Cryptos Alternative Economy
 On Oil & Gas Crowdfunding
 The Fed waits with Rates for Bankrate
 
 
 
 

Living people
Harvard Business School faculty
Hult International Business School faculty
Babson College faculty
Harvard Business School alumni
Boston University School of Management alumni
Boston University faculty
Northeastern University alumni
Harvard Institute for International Development
Harvard College alumni
Year of birth missing (living people)